Mangala is a weekly Kannada film magazine, circulated in Karnataka, India.

Background
Mangala was started as a monthly magazine in 1969. Then its frequency became biweekly and then weekly. It (RNI:44741/89) is owned by Mangalam Publication (India) Pvt. Ltd., located in Kottayam, Kerala.

Sister publications 
 Balamangala, a defunct Kannada fortnightly children magazine

See also 
 List of Kannada-language magazines
 Media in Karnataka
 Media of India
 Roopatara, a Kannada monthly film magazine

References

External links

Film magazines published in India
Weekly magazines published in India
Kannada-language magazines
Mass media in Bangalore
Magazines established in 1969
Monthly magazines published in India
Biweekly magazines published in India